Qatar competed at the 2000 Summer Olympics in Sydney, Australia.

Medalists

Results by event

Athletics
Men's 400m
Ibrahim Ismail Muftah
 Round 1 – 45.48
 Round 2 – 45.96 (did not advance)
Salaheldin Elsafi Bakkar
 Round 1 – 46.16 (did not advance)

Men's 800m
Abdu I. Yousuf
 Round 1 – 01:53.23 (did not advance)

Men's 5,000m
Mohammed Suleiman
 Round 1 – 13:30.12
 Final – 13:45.10 (14th place) 
Ahmed Ibrahim Warsama
 Round 1 – 14:00.30 (did not advance)

Men's 4 × 400 m
Ahmed H. Al-Imam, Salaheldin Elsafi Bakkar, Mubarak Faraj Al-Nubi, Ibrahim Ismail Muftah
 Round 1 – DQ (did not advance)

Men's 3,000m Steeplechase
Khamis Abdullah Saifeldin
 Round 1 – 08:23.94
 Final – 08:30.89 (10th place)

Men's Shot Put
Bilal Saad Mubarak
 Qualifying – 18.30 (did not advance)

Men's Discus
Rashid Shafi Al-Dosari
 Qualifying – 54.47 (did not advance)

Men's Long Jump
Abdulrahman Faraj Al-Nubi
 Qualifying – NM (did not advance)

Men's Marathon
Rashid Khaled Jamal
 Final – DNF

Swimming
Men's 50m Freestyle
Wael G. Saeed
 Preliminary Heat – 25.43 (did not advance)

Weightlifting

Men

References

Wallechinsky, David (2004). The Complete Book of the Summer Olympics (Athens 2004 Edition). Toronto, Canada. . 
International Olympic Committee (2001). The Results. Retrieved 12 November 2005.
Sydney Organising Committee for the Olympic Games (2001). Official Report of the XXVII Olympiad Volume 1: Preparing for the Games. Retrieved 20 November 2005.
Sydney Organising Committee for the Olympic Games (2001). Official Report of the XXVII Olympiad Volume 2: Celebrating the Games. Retrieved 20 November 2005.
Sydney Organising Committee for the Olympic Games (2001). The Results. Retrieved 20 November 2005.
International Olympic Committee Web Site
sports-reference

Nations at the 2000 Summer Olympics
2000
Olympics